Abdullah Shaib Abdallah (born ) is a Tanzanian male weightlifter, competing in the 56 kg category and representing Tanzania at international competitions. He participated at the 2014 Commonwealth Games in the 56 kg event.

Major competitions

References

1992 births
Living people
Tanzanian male weightlifters
Weightlifters at the 2014 Commonwealth Games
Commonwealth Games competitors for Tanzania